Gaitelgrima of Salerno (fl. 1091), was princess consort of Capua by marriage to Jordan I of Capua. She was regent of Capua in 1091 during the minority of her sons, Richard, Robert, and Jordan.

Life
She was the daughter of Guaimar IV of Salerno and Gemma.  She was the direct sister of Gisulf II of Salerno and Sichelgaita.

She was first married to Richard Aversa and after his death was forced to marry his son Jordan I of Capua, who according to pope Gregor VII dragged the unwilling woman to be married.

After being widowed by Jordan 1091, she took up the regency of her sons, Richard, Robert, and Jordan. Later the same year, however, she was expelled from Capua by the citizens, who elected one Count Lando as their prince, and she took her sons with her to Aversa.

In Sarno, she sheltered her brother Gisulf in his final days and there he is buried. She remarried to Alfred, Count of Sarno, and it was to Sarno that she retired eventually.

References

 "Giordano I." Dizionario Biografico degli Italiani. Mario Caravale, ed. Rome: 2003.
Alessandra Daga: GAITELGRIMA. In: Dizionario Biografico degli Italiani. Band 51. Benevent 1998, available online via trecanni.it.

11th-century Italian women
11th-century women rulers
Lombard princesses
11th-century Lombard people